Agnew Lake may refer to:

Agnew Lake (California)
Agnew Lake (Ontario)